The Colorado Department of Agriculture is the principal department of the Colorado state government that manages agriculture, food safety, agriculture-related consumer protection, and conservation districts. Kate Greenberg was appointed as Commissioner of the Department in 2019, replacing Don Brown, who retired after serving since 2015.

Organization

The department is organized into these divisions:

Animal Health Division
Brands Division
Colorado State Fair
Commissioner's Office 
Conservation Services Division
Inspection & Consumer Services Division
Markets Division
Plant Industry Division
Division of Laboratory Services

The commissioner also serves as a non-voting member of the board of directors of the Colorado Agricultural Development Authority (CADA), created in 1981 to make financing available for farmers and other agricultural enterprises due to the high cost and lack of available agricultural loans, and the insufficiency of gainful employment in rural areas. CADA board members are also ex officio members (the commissioner is a non-voting member) of the Colorado Agricultural Value-Added Board (CAVADB), which make grants, loans, loan guarantees and equity investments concerning rural Colorado.

The Colorado State Conservation Board (CSCB) is composed of representatives of Colorado's ten watersheds, representing Colorado's seventy-six conservation districts.

References

External links
 Official website

State departments of agriculture of the United States
State agencies of Colorado